Sir Algar Henry Stafford Howard  (7 August 1880 – 14 February 1970) was a senior British Army officer and long-serving officer of arms at the College of Arms in London. He served as the Garter Principal King of Arms from 1944 to 1950 before retiring. He was the third consecutive Fitzalan Pursuivant of Arms Extraordinary to attain the highest rank at the College of Arms.

Early life and family
Algar Henry Stafford Howard was born on 7 August 1880. He was the eldest son of Sir Edward Stafford Howard, KCB, JP, DL (1851–1916), of Thornbury Castle and Cilymeanllwyd in Carmarthenshire, and his first wife, Lady Rachel Campbell (died 1906), youngest daughter of John Campbell, 2nd Earl Cawdor. He married Violet Ethel, daughter of Sir Henry Meysey Meysey-Thompson, 1st and last Baron Knaresborough, on 11 October 1921. She was the widow of Captain Alexander Moore Vandeleur, 2nd Life Guards, who was killed in action at Zandvoorde during the First Battle of Ypres on 30 October 1914. 

The couple had two daughters: Anne Violet (born 1923), who married John Cahill, son of John Cahill, of Knockrom West in Cartaglon; and Elizabeth Helen (born 1924), who married Harold William Norman Suckling Walker, eldest son of Colonel James Coulthard Walker of the Indian Army.

Military career
Howard was appointed a Second lieutenant of the Carmarthen Militia Artillery on 31 January 1900, and was promoted to Lieutenant on 6 September 1900. In the First World War Howard served with the Royal Gloucestershire Hussars. He won the Military Cross and attained the rank of Major general.

Heraldic career
Howard was educated at Harrow School and King's College London. Howard began his heraldic career on 23 May 1911 with an appointment as Fitzalan Pursuivant of Arms Extraordinary for the coronation of King George V. This was followed in October of that year with an appointment to the office of Rouge Dragon Pursuivant of Arms in Ordinary. 

In 1919, Howard was promoted to the office of Windsor Herald of Arms in Ordinary and he held this position until 1931. In that year he was made Norroy King of Arms when Sir Gerald Woods Wollaston was promoted. Howard was also appointed Registrar of the College of Arms in 1928, and during the Second World War the records of the college were stored at his home of Thornbury Castle in Gloucestershire for safekeeping. 

In 1943, the office of Ulster King of Arms was merged with that of Norroy and Howard became the first Norroy and Ulster King of Arms. He remained in this office until 1944 when he was promoted to Garter Principal King of Arms. He retired from this office, and from the College of Arms, in 1950.

Howard was created Commander of the Royal Victorian Order (CVO) in 1935, Companion of the Bath (CB) in 1937, Knight Commander of the Royal Victorian Order (KCVO) in 1944, and Knight Commander of the Bath (KCB) in 1951.

Arms

See also
Heraldry
Pursuivant
Herald
King of Arms

References

Appointment to Norroy, The Times, 7 February 1931
Obituary, The Times, 16 February 1970

External links
The College of Arms
CUHAGS Officer of Arms Index

1880 births
1970 deaths
People educated at Harrow School
Alumni of King's College London
Volunteer Force officers
British Army personnel of World War I
20th-century British Army personnel
English officers of arms
Knights Commander of the Royal Victorian Order
Knights Commander of the Order of the Bath
Recipients of the Military Cross
Gentlemen Ushers
Algar Howard
Royal Gloucestershire Hussars officers
Garter Principal Kings of Arms